Mark Higgins (born 16 May 1963) was one of the world's leading strongman competitors, having won the World Strongman Challenge on two occasions, and was the British Muscle Power Champion on four occasions. Previously, he was an international discus thrower and had been a sailor and basketball player at a high level.

Sporting career
Mark was renowned as a great all-rounder. Mark Higgins threw the discus internationally for Great Britain. His best performance was a creditable 50.80m in a meet in Solihull on 13 Aug 1990, although this placed him well down the all-time British list. In addition to this, he was an international basketball player, a champion powerlifter and was also selected to travel with the British sailing team to Australia for the America's Cup.

Standing at 6’9", and weighing 364 pounds, Mark Higgins was the biggest international strongman produced by Britain. His competitive era ran concurrently with that of Jamie Reeves. Thus, despite attaining a career high of winning back-to-back World Strongman Challenge titles in 1989 and 1990, he was still considered Britain's number two man, Jamie Reeves being the winner of the World's Strongest Man. Together, they were the runners-up in the World's Strongest Team competition of 1988, which he had previously won with Geoff Capes in 1987.

In addition he had podium finishes in the World Muscle Power Championships and was a multiple winner of the highly regarded Le Defi Mark Ten International.

References

1963 births
Living people
Place of birth missing (living people)
English strength athletes
British strength athletes
English male discus throwers
British male discus throwers